The men's freestyle 97 kg is a competition featured at the 2016 European Wrestling Championships, and was held in Riga, Latvia on March 9.

Medalists

Results
Legend
R — Retired
F — Won by fall

Final

Top half

Bottom half

Repechage

References
Official website

Men's freestyle 97 kg